Mu ping is a portion of street food in Thailand. It started to get popular in 1952. Mu ping can be eaten as breakfast, lunch, or dinner. Mu ping is a common food to find in the street of Thailand that usually start to sell around 5 am-11 am. Mu Ping is eaten with sticky rice. The set of the meal comes as three skewers of Mu Ping and a package sticky rice. The price per stick is around 5 - 10 Baht depending on pork prices.

The name Mu ping came from the Thai word "หมูปิ้ง" which means grilled pork. The word "Mu" means pork and "Ping" means grilling.

Ingredients 
The ingredients needed to cook Mu ping are:
 Pork: The main meat of the dish.
 Coriander roots: Used to increase aroma and reduce meat odors.
 Black peppers: Used to add the mild spiciness to the dish.
 Galics: Used to add sweetness and spiciness to the dish, also enhance aroma.
 Fish sauce: Used to add saltiness to the dish.
 Palm sugar: Used to add sweetness to the diss.
 Soy sauce: Used as the main marinades for Mu ping Boran.
 Milk: Used as the main marinades for Mu ping nom sod.

Preparation 
There are 2 types of Mu ping currently in the market. Milk Grilled and Mu ping Boran. It can be found depending on the area but as of today, Milk Grilled is easier to find due too low cost and being more flavored.

Thai-style (Mu ping Boran) 
This is the original type of Mu ping. It's purely red meat with fat on the bottom of the skewer or with no fat. The pork is marinated in the mixture of coriander roots, black peppers, galics, and soy sauce as the main marinade. Fish sauce and sugar can be added up to the preferences. The marinating process takes around 20 minutes. Then grilled over a charcoal BBQ. This type of Mu ping is harder to find since the cost is higher because it is wholly pork with no other ingredients and the size is a lot smaller than Milk-grilled Mu ping.

Milk-Grilled (Mu ping nom sod) 
This type of Mu ping is very common in the street. The pork is also marinated in the mixture of coriander roots, black peppers, galics, and milk as the main marinade instead. Fish sauce and sugar can be added up to the preferences. The milk is what caused the meat to be more tender and flavorful. The marinating process takes around 20 minutes.  Then also grilled over a charcoal BBQ. Anyone can start selling Milk-Grilled Mu ping as the premade are sold at supermarkets or shopping malls. Customers can find more flavors to choose from depending on the seller.

Both types of Mu ping are usually served with sticky rice and sometimes Nam chim Chaeo. Which is a spicy sauce that complements grilled meat.

Nutrition 
The nutrition gets from 1 skewer containing:

Protein 
Containing amino acids, high-protein foods make you feel full. Thus, making it possible to consume food in reduced amounts in the long run. body weight will gradually decrease as well but consumers need to control carbohydrate intake properly.

Phosphorus 
Phosphorus can help promote healthy gums and teeth and helps in the growth repair of the worn parts of the body. It also helps relieve pain from arthritis and contributes to the process of fat and starch metabolism. Which makes the body more energetic.

Vitamin B1 
Thiamine or known as Vitamin B1 has the benefits of strengthening growth, digesting starchy foods as well maintain the nervous system, muscles, and heart to function normally.

Health 
Mu ping is grilled meat, it has a group of chemicals called Polycyclic Aromatic Hydrocarbons (PAHs) that are also linked to cancers. PAHs are produced during pyrolysis and incomplete burning of organic materials such as wood, coal, and oil. It will form when the meat juices drip onto the coals or other heating surfaces and flare up in flames and smoke. The grill rack used in the stove often has burned-up pieces that are stuck on the grill. Common grilling methods (using either charcoal or gas fuel) could produce PAHs in food and contamination has been reported in different food products such as cereals, vegetables, fruits, dairy products, oils, coffee, tea, and meat products. In comparison to gas grilling, charcoal grilling led to significantly higher contents of PAHs in all types of Skewer, which could be the result of incomplete charcoal burning.

See also
 Kai yang
 List of pork dishes
 List of street foods
 Thai cuisine

References 

Thai cuisine
Street food in Thailand